Bookwalter is an unincorporated community in Paint Township, Fayette County, Ohio, United States.

The Bookwalter Post Office was established on November 28, 1881, which closed on July 14, 1904. The mail service is now sent through the Jeffersonville branch.

References 

Unincorporated communities in Fayette County, Ohio